This page provides the party lists put forward in New Zealand's 2002 election. Party lists determine (in the light of proportional voting) the appointment of list MPs under the mixed-member proportional (MMP) electoral system. Only registered parties are eligible for the party vote and are required to submit party lists. Unregistered parties that are only contesting electorates do not have party lists.

Parliamentary parties
The following parties gained representation:

ACT New Zealand

Green Party

Jim Anderton's Progressive Coalition

Labour Party

National Party
The National Party had 65 candidates on their list.

New Zealand First

United Future

Unsuccessful registered parties
The following registered parties did not gain representation:

Alliance

Aotearoa Legalise Cannabis Party

Christian Heritage Party

Mana Maori Movement

NMP

OneNZ Party

Outdoor Recreation NZ

References

 
 

2002 New Zealand general election
Lists of New Zealand political candidates
Party lists